San Francesco is a Baroque architecture, Roman Catholic church in Atri, Province of Teramo, Region of Abruzzo, Italy.

History
The first mention of the church is in documents from 1296. There are portions of the layout that date to the 13th-century, but the most of the church was destroyed during an earthquake in 1688, and reconstruction began in 1715 using designs of Giovanni Battista Gianni, and was completed by 1760.

References

Churches in the province of Teramo
Baroque architecture in Abruzzo
18th-century Roman Catholic church buildings in Italy
Roman Catholic churches completed in 1760
Franciscan churches in Italy